Audrey Reid may refer to:

 Audrey Reid (athlete) (born 1952), Jamaican high jumper
 Audrey Reid (actress) (born 1970), Jamaican film actress